Käthe Buchler (1876–1930) was a German photographer.

Biography 
Buchler née von Rhamm was born on 11 October 1876 in Braunschweig, Germany. A self-taught photographer, her husband gave Buchler her first camera (a binocular Voigtländer) in 1901. During World War I Buchler recorded daily life in Braunschweig including war efforts, orphaned children, and wounded soldiers. Buchler worked mainly with black and white film but also experimented with the new Autochrome process.

Buchler died on 14 September 1930 in Brunswick. In 2017 and 2018 an exhibition of Buchler's work Beyond the Battlefields:Käthe Buchler’s Photographs of Germany in the Great War was shown at the University of Hertfordshire and the University of Birmingham.

Gallery

References

External links
 
 Die Welt in Farbe. Käthe Buchler – Autochrome 1913 bis 1930. (The world in color. Käthe Buchler - Autochrome 1913 to 1930.) Museum für Photographie Braunschweig

1876 births
1930 deaths
Artists from Braunschweig
German women photographers
20th-century German women artists